Octagonal refers to the property of an object shaped like an octagon.

Octagonal may also refer to:

2022 FIFA World Cup qualification – CONCACAF Third Round, nicknamed the Octagonal
Octagonal (horse) (1992–2016), New Zealand racehorse that raced in Australia
Octagonal tiling
Truncated octagonal tiling
Truncated order-4 octagonal tiling
Order-6 octagonal tiling
Order-8 octagonal tiling
Truncated order-8 octagonal tiling
Snub octagonal tiling
Octagonal number
Centered octagonal number
Octagonal polyhedra
Octagonal prism
Octagonal antiprism
Octagonal prismatic prism
Octagonal bipyramid
Octagonal trapezohedron
Octagonal polychoron
Octagonal antiprismatic prism
List of octagonal buildings and structures
Octagonal barn (disambiguation)
Octagonal house
Octagonal School (disambiguation)
Octagonal Building (disambiguation)
Octagonal deadhouse

See also 

Octagon (disambiguation)